Teresa Cheung Siu-wai (born June 10, 1963) is a Canadian actress and producer.

Early life

Born in Hong Kong to parents of Shanghainese descent, Cheung appeared in her first advertisement at the age of three. 

She was born in a scholarly family in Hong Kong in 1963, her original name was Zhang Rongfang (章蓉舫). Rongfang is the nickname of her grandfather, and later this household name is actually Teresa's nickname.  Her grandfather was a senior official in the Republic of China, while her father immigrated to Canada and founded Zhang Jianguo, the first Chinese radio station in Canada. Teresa's mother, Zhou Wanjun (周婉筠) was born in a famous family and brought a maidservant when she got married.

Her father, Francis Cheung (章建国) was born in Shaoxing, who founded Canadian Chinese TV, passed away at the age of 85. After he immigrated to Canada that year, he found that many elderly people were bored at home, so he decided to create a Chinese TV. But it is not easy to establish a Chinese TV station in Canada. At that time, he ran around, contacted local celebrities, and established a Chinese advisory group. When the Canadian Video Committee (CRTC) held a hearing, he was also awarded the President of the Bar Association and members of the Federal Parliament. 

Teresa attended primary and secondary school at Maryknoll Convent School, Hong Kong. After relocating to Canada at age 15 with her family, she studied at the University of Toronto, majoring in Fine Arts History and English literature.

She moved to Los Angeles in 2006.

Career

Despite having no prior experience as a professional actor, Cheung was given a leading role in the 2004 film Colour Blossoms. Writer/director Yonfan stated that she was his inspiration for the film. Cheung received a number of awards and nominations for her role, only narrowly missing out on a Best Actress Award to Zhang Ziyi from the Hong Kong Film Critics Society.

In 2005, Cheung signed with the China Central Television (CCTV), becoming the first female, Hong Kong-based actress to join the network artist management.

Diamond Trade Center invited Cheung to the Oscars 2006 Diamond Aquifer Suite Event at the Soho House in Los Angeles, making her the first Asian actress ever invited.

Cheung is credited as an executive producer on Oliver Stone's film, W., and has a cameo role as the journalist "Miss China."

Personal life

In 1988, Cheung married Hong Kong pop star and actor Kenny Bee. The couple divorced in 1997.

Filmography

Awards and nominations

References

External links
Official site

Hong Kong film actresses
Hong Kong emigrants to Canada
Living people
University of Toronto alumni
1963 births